In professional sports, a franchise player is an athlete who is both the best player on their team and one that the team can build their "franchise" around for the foreseeable future.

Overview 
In the United States, outstanding players were referred to as "franchises" at least as far back as the 1950s. By the 1970s, the concept of a "franchise" player who single-handedly generates success was commonly understood in the sporting trade. The term franchise player was in widespread use by the early 1980s to describe both star rookies like John Elway and Kelvin Bryant and veterans like George Brett. While the term is primarily associated with North American and English sports, it is sometimes used in reference to athletes in sports outside the United States, such as rugby league and association football (soccer) players.

See also 
Designated player (disambiguation)
Franchise tag

References 

Sports terminology